Signs of the Times Publishing Association (STPA) is one of the 62 Signs of the Times Publishing Houses around the world that belongs to the Seventh-day Adventist Church (SDA) and it is the only official publishing house in Chinese. STPA was first established by an American pastor named Dr. Harry Willis Miller in Henan province, China in 1905. After being relocated several times through years, STPA was finally moved to Taipei, Taiwan (its current position) in 1963. STPA provides not only spiritual publications for SDA members, but also promotes its reading materials door to door through literature evangelists in order to spread God's gospel.

The first Signs of the Times Publishing House was originally established in 1852 by an American pastor named James White (1821–1881), who purchased a small press and started to print pamphlets. Based upon that, it gradually developed and became the first publishing house of SDA Publishing Association. Adventist Church claimed currently she has a worldwide baptized membership of about over 17 million people and she operates numerous institutions, churches, schools, health centers, clinics, hospitals and 62 publishing houses in over 200 countries.

History 
Signs of the Times Publishing House Started from 1905, major historical events are briefly listed as follows:

Chief Managers 
(Signs of the Times Publishing House was established in Taiwan in 1963)

Chief Editors

Sister Organizations 
Taiwan Adventist Hospital
Taiwan Adventist College
Seventh-day Adventist Church Taiwan Conference
Seventh-day Adventist Church Chinese Union Mission
Seventh-day Adventist Church Japan Publishing House
Seventh-day Adventist Church Korea Publishing House

References 
official website
The Last Day Shepherd's Call

External links 
Seventh-day Adventist Church
Seventh-day Adventist Church Northern Asia-Pacific Division
Seventh-day Adventist Church Chinese Union Mission
Adventist World
Taiwan Adventist College

Christian publishing companies
Companies based in Taipei
Seventh-day Adventist media
Seventh-day Adventist organizations